Peter James Colston (died December 2022) was an English rugby union player and coach.

In a playing career which lasted from 1957 to 1967 he played 252 first team matches for Bristol, scoring 21 tries. He also played for the Gloucestershire and Somerset county teams.

After Colston's playing career ended he became Bristol's first official coach, and went on to coach the England under-23 team and finally the England national rugby union team from 1975 to 1979.

References

Year of birth missing
2022 deaths
English rugby union players
English rugby union coaches
England national rugby union team coaches
Bristol Bears players
Gloucestershire County RFU players
Rugby union centres
Somerset County RFU players